Joyce O'Connor was President of National College of Ireland for fifteen years. She is a sister of Seán FitzPatrick.

Educated in Loreto Convent Bray and University College Dublin, O'Connor was Senior Research Fellow in the Department of Social Science, UCD and Head of the Department of Languages and Applied Social Studies at the University of Limerick where she founded and directed the Social Research Centre.

O'Connor has published widely on education and access issues, entrepreneurship, women in business, careers, innovation and enterprise, drinking & smoking behaviours and the elderly. Professor O’Connor is involved in many Corporate Social Responsibility (CSR) initiatives and is co-editor of a book on the area.

During her period as President she managed the major expansion of the College including the major increase in student numbers and the relocation of the College from Ranelagh to the campus in the IFSC.

References 

Living people
Alumni of University College Dublin
Presidents of the National College of Ireland
Academics of the University of Limerick
Year of birth missing (living people)